Ged Grimes (born on 28 March 1962) is a Scottish musician, producer and composer. He is currently the bass player for rock band Simple Minds, and was a founding member of Scottish pop band Danny Wilson whose hits include "Mary's Prayer" (from Meet Danny Wilson and featured prominently in the Original Motion Picture Soundtrack to the movie There's Something About Mary), and "The Second Summer of Love" (from Bebop Moptop).

Musical career

Danny Wilson (1984–1991)

After Danny Wilson 
After the break-up of Danny Wilson, Grimes began to focus on writing, performing, and producing other artists including Eddi Reader, Simply Red, and Natalie Imbruglia.

Grimes has also done a substantial amount of work for both television and film. His television credits include Tartan Shorts. As the owner of Jack's Hoose Music, Grimes has worked on a number of interactive entertainment media projects in recent years. Grimes composed the soundtrack for the PC game Earthworm Jim 3D; other Jack's Hoose Music projects included score material for Universal Pictures, including work featured on the trailer for The Bourne Supremacy. Grimes has been featured on tracks for Sony PS2's (PlayStation 2) DJ Decks and FX, music themes for a series of mobile games for Digital Bridges, including movie franchise The Fast and the Furious, and the interactive music soundtrack to Namco Japan’s rhythm action title, "Rhythmic Star". Grimes' recent projects include title themes for Sky Games including Shrek the Third (video game), Ben 10, Goldenballs and the Latin American flavoured soundtrack to iPhone and iPad game Quarrel.

Grimes, who is fluent in the Spanish language, relocated from Dundee, Scotland, to Andalucia, Spain, in 2005 and ran Jack Hoose Music's international, day-to-day business from there.

In recent years Grimes has been part of Deacon Blue. He played bass on the first live incarnation of Lostboy! AKA Jim Kerr, appearing on the short Lostboy! AKA Promo Tour 2010.

Joining Simple Minds (2010–present)  
On 11 September 2010, Grimes made his debut as Simple Minds' new bass player. His first live appearance with Simple Minds took place in Paris, France, at the Fête de l'Humanité festival. Simple Minds were headlining and played in front of an audience of 80,000 that evening.  Grimes featured on the band's Celebrate – Live At The Glasgow SSE Hydro DVD (recorded in 2013) and played on the subsequent albums Big Music, Walk between Worlds, and Direction of the Heart.

Instruments
Ged Grimes is an official endorser of the Sandberg Guitars California PM bass guitar. On 21 July 2011, Markbass products announced they had also picked up Ged Grimes' endorsement.

References

External links

The Courier - Just a Simple Week at Work for Ged Grimes
simpleminds.com - Official Website
Ged Grimes on Dundee
Ged Grimes Official MySpace

Living people
Musicians from Dundee
Simple Minds members
Scottish bass guitarists
1962 births